Duffy of San Quentin is a 1954 American film noir crime film directed by Walter Doniger and written by Walter Doniger and Berman Swarttz. The film stars Louis Hayward, Joanne Dru, Paul Kelly, Maureen O'Sullivan, George Macready and Horace McMahon. The film was released by Warner Bros. on March 16, 1954.

Plot

Clinton T. Duffy (Paul Kelly (Kelly was a prisoner in San Quentin in the 1920s)) suddenly has a job few would ever want. He's the interim warden at San Quentin, given the job for 30 days after violence and corruption swept what was then the nation's largest prison facility. Duffy aims to make his few days matter, cracking down on notorious guards, wiping out a stool-pigeon network and hiring the institute's first female nurse (Joanne Dru). The reforms take hold. Duffy's 30 days would become 12 years. Based on his memoir, Duffy of San Quentin tells the story of the warden's pivotal early tenure through the prism of his interactions with volatile inmate Edward Harper (Louis Hayward). Filmmaker Walter Doniger guides the action. He next made the prison film The Steel Cage (with Kelly and Maureen O’Sullivan returning as the Duffys) and explored life behind bars again in The Steel Jungle

Cast  
Louis Hayward as Edward 'Romeo' Harper
Joanne Dru as Anne Halsey
Paul Kelly as Warden Clinton T. Duffy
Maureen O'Sullivan as Gladys Duffy
George Macready as John C. Winant
Horace McMahon as Pierson
Irving Bacon as Doc Sorin
Joel Fluellen as Bill Lake
Joe Turkel as Frank Roberts 
Jonathan Hale as Boyd
Michael McHale as Pinto
Peter Brocco as Nealy
Marshall Bradford as Lowell 
DeForest Kelley as Eddie Lee 
Sandy Aaronson as Guard

References

External links 
 

1954 films
Warner Bros. films
American crime drama films
1954 crime drama films
Films directed by Walter Doniger
Films scored by Paul Dunlap
1950s English-language films
American black-and-white films
1950s American films